Ochi is a mountain in the southeasternmost part of the island of Euboea, Greece. Its maximum elevation is 1,398 m. There are forests on the northern slopes while most of the mountain range is covered with grassland and bushes. It is 6 km northeast of the coastal town Karystos, 90 km southeast of the island capital Chalcis and 65 km east of Athens.

See also

 List of mountains in Greece

References

Euboea
Mountains of Greece
Mountains of Central Greece
Landforms of Euboea (regional unit)